John Humphries may refer to:

 John Humphries (author), Welsh journalist, author and politician
 John Humphries (baseball) (1861–1933), Canadian baseball player

See also
John Humphreys (disambiguation)